Cyrus Clay Carpenter (November 24, 1829 – May 29, 1898) was a Civil War officer, the eighth Governor of Iowa and U.S. Representative from Iowa's 9th congressional district.

Early life
Born near Harford, Pennsylvania, Carpenter attended the common schools, and was graduated from Harford Academy in 1853. His parents were Asahel Carpenter and Amanda M. Thayer and he is a descendant of the immigrant William Carpenter (1605 England - 1658/1659 Rehoboth, Massachusetts) the founder of the Rehoboth Carpenter family who came to America in the mid-1630s.

Early work
He moved to Iowa in 1854 and engaged in teaching in Fort Dodge, Iowa, and afterwards in land surveying, working as the County surveyor of Webster County in 1856. He studied law but never practiced. In March, 1857, he joined the relief expedition sent to Spirit Lake to aid the settlers driven from their homes by the Sioux Indians in the aftermath of the Spirit Lake Massacre.

He initially served as member of the Iowa House of Representatives from 1858 to 1860.

Civil War
During the Civil War Carpenter volunteered as a private then was elected captain of volunteers on March 24, 1862, appointed lieutenant colonel on September 26, 1864, and brevet colonel on July 12, 1865 "for efficient and meritorious services" when he was in charge of commissary of subsistence in Sherman's Army on the march to the sea. He was mustered out July 14, 1865. During the war he served on the staff of Generals William Rosecrans, Grenville M. Dodge and John A. Logan.

After his service, he returned to Iowa where he married Susan C. Burkholder of Fort Dodge. He was elected as registrar of the Iowa state land office, from 1866 to 1868.

Mid life
In 1871, he was run as a Republican for Governor of Iowa, winning his first two-year term.  He was re-elected to a second term in 1873, serving until early 1876. At the expiration of his term he was appointed Second Comptroller of the Treasury of the United States, where he served two years, from January 1876 to September 1877. On March 26, 1878, he was appointed as a railroad commissioner of Iowa.

In 1878 Carpenter was elected to Congress to represent Iowa's 9th congressional district, which was then made up of the sparsely-settled northwestern quadrant of the state.  After serving in the 46th United States Congress, he was re-elected in 1880 and served in the 47th United States Congress.  He did not seek re-election to Congress in 1882. In all, he served in Congress from March 4, 1879 to March 3, 1883.

Later life
In 1883, he again ran for the state legislature, winning election to the Iowa House of Representatives for a two-year term, and serving from 1884 to 1886.

Returning to Iowa from Washington, District of Columbia for the last time, he served as postmaster of Fort Dodge from 1889 to 1893. He also engaged in the management of his farm and in the real-estate business.

He died in Fort Dodge on May 29, 1898. He was interred in Oakland Cemetery in Fort Dodge.

See also

References

External links
  Biographical Directory of the American Congress, 1774-1949. Pages 950-951.

1829 births
1898 deaths
People from Susquehanna County, Pennsylvania
Republican Party members of the Iowa House of Representatives
Republican Party governors of Iowa
Union Army officers
American people of English descent
People of Iowa in the American Civil War
Comptrollers of the United States Treasury
People from Webster County, Iowa
Republican Party members of the United States House of Representatives from Iowa
19th-century American politicians
19th-century American businesspeople
Military personnel from Pennsylvania